The Hyatt Regency Delhi is a hotel in New Delhi, India, opened in 1983, with 486 rooms and 51 suites. It is located in Bhikaji Cama Place, near Chanakyapuri, in South Delhi. It was managed by Hyatt until November 2020, The hotel no longer has any association with the Hyatt chain, but continues to use the Hyatt name.

History

Asian Hotels (North) Ltd was incorporated in 1980 and was promoted by R S Saraf, R K Jatia, Chaman Lal Gupta, three non-resident Indians together with Sushil Gupta and Shiv Jatia, their Indian Associates. The builders entered into a 10-year franchise agreement with Hyatt International, and the new hotel was the chain's first hotel in India. The hotel's construction was spurred by the Asian Games in 1982. The Hyatt Regency Delhi opened in 1983.

The hotel ceased to be associated with Hyatt Hotels on November 6, 2020 and entered bankruptcy in 2021.

Design

The design of the hotel features a staggered facade, with stepped back rooms.

Controversies
On Sunday, March 17, 2002, 31-year-old socialite-photographer Natasha Singh, daughter-in-law of Natwar Singh, of the Indian National Congress, was found dead at the hotel after allegedly jumping from the roof.

References

Hotels in Delhi
Hotels established in 1983
Hotel buildings completed in 1983
20th-century architecture in India